is a Japanese musician, singer-songwriter, composer and  actor who is represented by the talent agency, Mother Enterprise. He graduated from Seijo Gakuen Junior High School and High School and Seijo University Faculty of Law. He is business partners with Horipro. His wife was actress and Takarazuka Revue graduate Rei Dan (July 2011 - Nov 2018).

Biography
Mitsuhiro Oikawa started as a stage theater actor through his band activities, and started his singing debut with the single, "Morality" on 1996. Since his debut, he had been the self-proclaimed "Prince", and on August 22, 1998 on Hitori no Big Show 98: Mamiya no Seisen he had a "Prince Career Change Declaration".

On 1998, Mitsuhiro Oikawa started as an actor and appeared on the drama, With Love.

On July 27, 2011, Mitsuhiro Oikawa married actress, Rei Dan.

On July 31, 2012, Mitsuhiro Oikawa announced a business partnership with Horipro. His works on television dramas, films, and advertisements will be active in the Horipro affiliation, while his music activities and his fan club management is continued with his affiliation agreement with his current office, Mother Enterprise.

On July 6, 2015, Mitsuhiro Oikawa announced that he amicably terminated the contract of Mother Enterprise. His future management business, including his acting activities were entrusted to DG Agent, and continues his partnership with Horipro.

On November 28, 2018, Mitsuhiro Oikawa divorced actress Rei Dan.

Filmography

TV series

Films

References

External links
 

Japanese male singer-songwriters
Japanese singer-songwriters
Japanese male actors
1969 births
Living people
Singers from Tokyo
Seijo University alumni